The Modern Magic Made Simple anime adaptation was produced by Nomad (studio). The first episode numbered 00, was first shown at a joint event of Gendai Mahou and Hatsukoi Limited held on June 14, 2009, this episode was later streamed online by Bandai Channel from June 29 till July 6, 2009. The TV series started airing on July 11, 2009.

The opening theme is "programming for non-fiction" by Natsuko Aso. The ending theme "Made in WONDER" by Aki Misato.

Episodes
All the episode titles are taken from programming-related terms and slangs, all by the author of the light novel Hiroshi Sakurazaka.

References

External links
Anime official website 

Modern Magic Made Simple